Dendrobium section Dendrocoryne is a subgenus of the genus Dendrobium.

Description
Plants in this section have nodded pseudobulbs with two to six leaves at the apex with no leaf sheathing bases.

Distribution
Plants from this section are found in Australia and New Caledonia.

Species
Dendrobium section Dendrocoryne comprises the following species:

Natural Hybrids

References

Orchid subgenera